Hugh and Bessie Stephens House, also known as the Lincoln University President's Residence, is a historic home located in Jefferson City, Cole County, Missouri. It was designed by the architectural firm Tracy and Swartwout and built in 1913. It is a -story, French Eclectic style stone-clad dwelling.  It has a one-story wing and steeply pitched hipped roof with front facing cross gables on either corner.  Also on the property are the contributing hipped roof stone-clad garage and retaining wall connected to a square stone gazebo. The house has served as the Lincoln University President's residence since 1965.

It was listed on the National Register of Historic Places in 2009.

References

Houses on the National Register of Historic Places in Missouri
Houses completed in 1913
Buildings and structures in Jefferson City, Missouri
National Register of Historic Places in Cole County, Missouri